The Champlin Foundations are private foundations that make direct grants to tax exempt organizations and are one of the oldest philanthropic organization groups in Rhode Island. The majority of grants are made to organizations located in Rhode Island. The majority of grants are for capital needs. Capital needs may consist of equipment, construction, renovations, the purchase of real property and reduction of mortgage indebtedness.  PNC Bank/Delaware is the trustee of each foundation.

News
100 acres added to protected forest
USS Saratoga Museum Foundation
VNA of Care New England Receives Grant from The Champlin Foundations
Friends of Hearthside receives grant to fix roof and portico
Providence Athenaeum receives grant to renovate the bound periodical and rare book area

External links
The Champlin Foundations

Organizations based in Rhode Island